Leo Frederick Rayfiel (March 22, 1888 – November 18, 1978) was a United States representative from New York and a United States district judge of the United States District Court for the Eastern District of New York.

Education and career

Born in New York City, New York, Rayfiel received a Bachelor of Laws from New York University School of Law in 1908. He read law in 1918. He was in private practice of law in Brooklyn, New York from 1918 to 1945. He was a member of the New York State Assembly from 1939 to 1944. He was a United States representative from New York from 1945 to 1947.

Congressional service

Rayfiel was elected as a Democrat to the 79th United States Congress, reelected to the 80th United States Congress and served from January 3, 1945, until his resignation on September 13, 1947, to accept a federal judgeship.

Federal judicial service

Rayfiel was nominated by President Harry S. Truman on June 30, 1947, to a seat on the United States District Court for the Eastern District of New York vacated by Judge Grover M. Moscowitz. He was confirmed by the United States Senate on July 23, 1947, and received his commission on July 30, 1947. He assumed senior status on March 4, 1966. His service was terminated on November 18, 1978, due to his death in Wayne, New Jersey. He was interred in Wellwood Cemetery in West Babylon, New York.

Family

Screenwriter David Rayfiel (1923–2011) was his son.

See also
List of Jewish members of the United States Congress
List of Jewish American jurists

References

Sources

External links 
 

1888 births
1978 deaths
20th-century American politicians
20th-century American judges
New York University School of Law alumni
Democratic Party members of the New York State Assembly
Judges of the United States District Court for the Eastern District of New York
United States district court judges appointed by Harry S. Truman
Jewish members of the United States House of Representatives
Democratic Party members of the United States House of Representatives from New York (state)
Burials at Wellwood Cemetery